Günter Henle, also known as Günther Henle (February 3, 1899 – April 13, 1979) was a German politician, pianist, and music publisher.
He was a member of the Christian Democratic Union (CDU) and of the German Bundestag. He founded the music publisher G. Henle Verlag.

Life 
Henle also pursued a political career and was a member of the Frankfurt Economic Council from 1947 to 1949. He then belonged to the German Bundestag in its first legislative period (1949-1953) as a directly elected member of the Rhein-Wupper-Kreis constituency. From 1952 to 1953, he was also a member of the Common Assembly of the European Coal and Steel Community in Strasbourg, the predecessor of the European Parliament.

Literature

References

1899 births
1979 deaths
Members of the Bundestag for North Rhine-Westphalia
Members of the Bundestag 1949–1953
Members of the Bundestag for the Christian Democratic Union of Germany
Christian Democratic Union of Germany MEPs
MEPs for Germany 1958–1979